The economy of the Commonwealth of Virginia is well balanced with diverse sources of income. From the Hampton Roads area to Richmond and down to Lee County in the southwest includes military installations, cattle, tobacco and peanut farming in Southside Virginia.  Tomatoes recently surpassed soy as the most profitable crop in Virginia. Tobacco, peanuts and hay are also important agricultural products from the commonwealth. Wineries and vineyards in the Northern Neck and along the Blue Ridge Mountains also have become increasingly popular. Northern Virginia (once considered the state's dairy capital) hosts software, communications, consulting, defense contracting, diplomats, and considerable components of the professional government sector. As of the 2000 census, Virginia had the highest number of counties and independent cities (15) in the top 100 wealthiest jurisdictions in the United States based upon median income, in addition, Virginia tied with Colorado as having the most counties (10) in the top 100 based on per capita income. Loudoun and Fairfax counties in Northern Virginia have the highest and second highest median household income, respectively, of all counties in the United States .

Background 

The state GDP of Virginia was $383 billion in 2007, higher than the larger state of Michigan and comparable to Saudi Arabia. The per capita personal income was $35,477 in 2004. , Virginia had the highest number of counties and independent cities, fifteen, in the top one-hundred wealthiest jurisdictions in the United States based upon median income. In addition, Virginia tied with Colorado as having the most counties, ten, in the top one-hundred based on per capita income.

In 2006 and 2007, Forbes magazine voted Virginia as having the best climate for business in the United States citing economic growth, business costs/incentives and quality of life. CNBC ranked Virginia as the top state for business in 2007 as well.

Richmond is one of 12 cities in the country having a Federal Reserve bank. It, along with the New York and San Francisco Federal Reserve banks are the only ones that cover a non-state (Washington, D.C.).

There are seven Fortune 500 companies headquartered in Northern Virginia, and nine in the Richmond area (most of which are within the city itself.) Only five metro areas in the country have more Fortune 500 companies than the Richmond area. Virginia has seventeen total Fortune 500 companies, ranking the state tenth nationwide. Additionally, ten Fortune 1000 companies are in Northern Virginia, with a total of twenty-nine in the state. With only 1% of the Hispanic American population, the state claims 3.6% of Hispanic 500 companies.

Virginia, arguably the wealthiest southern state before the Civil War, recovered from the Civil War and the Great Depression much faster than the rest of the South. Today, Virginia is still one of the wealthiest states in the South. Virginia is also one of twenty-two right-to-work states.

Virginia is also comparable to Alaska and ahead of North Dakota and New Mexico in per capita defense spending.

Government
Virginia has the highest defense spending of any state per capita, providing the Commonwealth with around 900,000 jobs. Approximately 12% of all U.S. federal procurement money is spent in Virginia, the second-highest amount after California. Many Virginians work for federal agencies in Northern Virginia, which include the Central Intelligence Agency and the Department of Defense, as well as the National Science Foundation, the United States Geological Survey and the United States Patent and Trademark Office. Many others work for government contractors, including defense and security firms, which hold more than 15,000 federal contracts.

Virginia has one of the highest concentrations of veterans of any state, and is second to California in total Department of Defense employees. The Hampton Roads area has the largest concentration of military personnel and assets of any metropolitan area in the world, including the largest naval base in the world, Naval Station Norfolk. In its state government, Virginia employs 106,143 public employees, who combined have a median income of $44,656 .

Technology

According to the American Electronics Association, Virginia has the highest concentration of technology workers of any state. Computer chips became the state's highest-grossing export in 2006, surpassing its traditional top exports of coal and tobacco, combined. The Dulles Technology Corridor centered on the border of Fairfax County and Loudoun County near Dulles International Airport has a high concentration of Internet, communication technology and software engineering firms.

The state's biotechnology industry is not centralized, but growing, highlighted by the building of the Virginia BioTechnology Research Park biotech incubator in Richmond and the opening of the Howard Hughes Medical Institute's Janelia Farm in Northern Virginia.

Virginia's nanotechnology industry, centered in Hampton Roads and Northern Virginia, accounted for $1 billion in manufactured goods in 2006. Researchers in Hampton Roads, many of whom hold patents in the field, believe the region has an advantage in the commercialization of nanotechnology due to the amount of research, much of it spearheaded by NASA's Langley Research Center.

Taxation
Virginia collects personal income tax in five income brackets, ranging from 3.0% to 5.75%. The sales and use tax rate is 4%. The tax rate on food is 1.5%. There is an additional 1% local tax, for a total of a 5% combined sales tax on most Virginia purchases and a combined tax rate of 2.5% on food.
Virginia's property tax is set and collected at the local government level and varies throughout the commonwealth. Real estate is taxed at the local level based on 100% of fair market value. Effective true tax rates on real estate vary and are set by locality. Tangible personal property also is taxed at the local level and is based on a percentage or percentages of original cost. Tangible personal property includes, but is not limited to, machinery and equipment, furniture, fixtures, and trucks and automobiles. The Virginia General Assembly exempted intangible personal property from taxation in 1984 by making the tax rate zero. Virginia does not collect inheritance taxes; however, its estate tax is decoupled from the federal estate tax laws, and therefore the Commonwealth imposes its own estate tax.

See also
Virginia locations by per capita income

References